The Lawless Woman is a 1931 American crime film directed by Richard Thorpe and starring Vera Reynolds, Carroll Nye and Thomas E. Jackson.

Cast
 Vera Reynolds as June Page  
 Carroll Nye as Allan Perry  
 Thomas E. Jackson as 'Paddy' Reardon 
 Wheeler Oakman as 'Poker' Wilson  
 Gwen Lee as Kitty Adams 
 James P. Burtis as Bill  
 Phillips Smalley as Dan Taylor

References

Bibliography
 Michael R. Pitts. Poverty Row Studios, 1929–1940: An Illustrated History of 55 Independent Film Companies, with a Filmography for Each. McFarland & Company, 2005.

External links
 

1931 films
1931 crime films
1930s English-language films
American crime films
Films directed by Richard Thorpe
Chesterfield Pictures films
American black-and-white films
1930s American films